
Gmina Trzebinia is an urban-rural gmina (administrative district) in Chrzanów County, Lesser Poland Voivodeship, in southern Poland.

The gmina contains part of the protected area called Kraków Valleys Landscape Park.

Villages
Apart from the town of Trzebinia, Gmina Trzebinia contains the villages and settlements of Bolęcin, Czyżówka, Dulowa, Karniowice, Lgota, Młoszowa, Myślachowice, Piła Kościelecka, Płoki and Psary.

Neighbouring gminas
Gmina Trzebinia is bordered by the towns of Bukowno and Jaworzno, and by the gminas of Alwernia, Chrzanów, Krzeszowice and Olkusz.

References
Polish official population figures 2006

External links
19km From Auschwitz: The Story of Trzebinia an online exhibition by Yad Vashem

Trzebinia
Chrzanów County